Billy Famous (born in Lagos), is a Nigerian professional light/light welterweight boxer of the 1970s and '80s who won Nigerian lightweight title, Nigerian light welterweight title, African Boxing Union (ABU) light welterweight title, and Commonwealth lightweight title, his professional fighting weight varied from , i.e. lightweight to , i.e. light welterweight.

References

External links

Image - Billy Famous

Year of birth missing (living people)
Light-welterweight boxers
Lightweight boxers
African Boxing Union champions
Sportspeople from Lagos
Nigerian male boxers
Living people